This is a list of Swedish corvettes of the period 1821-2006.

Active

  (1984)
  (1985)

  (1989)
  (1990)
  (1990)
  (1991)

  (2000)
  (2003)
  (2004)
  (2005)
  (2006)

Historical corvettes

 
 
 
 
  (1848)
 
  (1885)

Steam-corvettes

  (1847)
  (1870)
  (1877)

Gallery

External links

 
Corvettes
Corvettes list
Sweden